HD 133131 is a binary star in the constellation of Libra. It is roughly 168 light-years (51.5 parsecs) away from the Sun. It consists of two G-type main-sequence stars; neither are bright enough to be seen with the naked eye.

Both components, HD 133131 A and B, are very similar to the Sun but are far older, about 6 billion years old. They also have low metallicities (50% of solar abundance), and HD 133131 A is additionally depleted in heavy elements compared to HD 133131 B, indicating a possibly past planetary engulfment event for HD 133131 B.

Planetary system
In 2016 two planets orbiting HD 133131 A and one planet orbiting HD 133131 B were discovered utilizing the radial velocity method.

References

Durchmusterung objects
073674
133131
G-type main-sequence stars
Binary stars
Libra (constellation)
Planetary systems with three confirmed planets
Multi-star planetary systems